Hymenobacter ginsengisoli  is a Gram-negative, and non-motile bacterium from the genus of Hymenobacter which has been isolated from soil from a ginseng field from the Chungnam Province in Korea.

References

External links
Type strain of Hymenobacter ginsengisoli at BacDive -  the Bacterial Diversity Metadatabase

gelipurpurascens
Bacteria described in 2013